This is a list of political parties stating that they represent Black people and Black interests.

Africa

Europe

North America

South America

See also
African nationalism
Anti-imperialism
Anti-racism
Black nationalism

References

African diaspora
 
Black